Daley Creek is a stream in the U.S. state of Oregon. It is a tributary to Beaver Dam Creek.

Daley Creek was named after one William Carter Daley.

References

Rivers of Oregon
Rivers of Jackson County, Oregon
Rivers of Klamath County, Oregon